Christopher Robert Segal (born July 13, 1982) is an American Major League Baseball (MLB) umpire. He wears number 96. He made his MLB umpiring debut in 2014.

Umpiring career
On July 17, 2017, Segal was struck in the head by the bat of Josh Donaldson in a game between the Toronto Blue Jays and the Boston Red Sox. Segal ended up remaining in the game.

Segal was the home plate umpire on July 30, 2017, when Adrián Beltré of the Texas Rangers got his 3,000th career hit against the Baltimore Orioles.

On August 9, 2019, Segal made headlines by ejecting Brett Gardner of the New York Yankees for arguing balls and strikes from the dugout despite Cameron Maybin being the one who was arguing. 

On September 13, 2020, Segal was the home plate umpire for a no-hitter thrown by Alec Mills of the Chicago Cubs against the Milwaukee Brewers.

See also

 List of Major League Baseball umpires

References

External links

Retrosheet
Covers.com

1982 births
Living people
People from Falls Church, Virginia
Major League Baseball umpires